Google Alerts is a content change detection and notification service, offered by Google. The service sends emails to the user when it finds new results—such as web pages, newspaper articles, blogs, or scientific research—that match the user's search term(s). In 2003, Google launched Google Alerts, which were the result of Naga Kataru's efforts. His name is on the three patents for Google Alerts.

Google reported the system was not functioning properly as of 2013: "we're having some issues with Alerts not being as comprehensive as we'd like". However, the service is still operational and completely accessible around the world.

See also 
 List of Google products
 Media monitoring service

References

External links 
 

Change detection and notification
Google services
Computer-related introductions in 2003